Traffic Broadcasting System (TBS) is a South Korean television and radio network about traffic in Seoul Capital Area.

This TV Station is run by Seoul Metropolitan Government and televises general news, information, documentaries, and sports about Seoul.

Especially, K League football matches with FC Seoul are very popular among viewers.

See also 
 KBS Radio 1
 KBS Radio 2
 EBS FM
 MBC FM4U
 CBS Music FM
 EBS 1TV
 Far East Broadcasting Company

External links 

 Official Website 
 tbs Sports YouTube 
 tbs Football Facebook 

Publicly funded broadcasters
Mass media companies of South Korea
Radio stations established in 1990
Radio stations in South Korea
Television channels and stations established in 2005
State media